RealPage  is an American multinational corporation that provides property management software for the multifamily, commercial, single-family and vacation rental housing industries. Dana Jones is Chairman of the Board & Chief Executive Officer. In October 2022, ProPublica reported that landlords use RealPage's asset optimization algorithm called YieldStar (later rebranded as AI Revenue Management) to increase rents throughout the United States, naming its users an illegal cartel that encouraged participants to withhold rental units from the market. Overwhelmingly, approximately 90% of property managers/landlords approve price change suggestions by the software. RealPage's software strongly discourages landlord users from negotiating asking rent prices with tenants.

History 
RealPage was founded in 1998 with the acquisition of Rent Roll, Inc., a provider of on-premises property management systems for the conventional and affordable multifamily rental housing markets.

RealPage moved its corporate headquarters to Richardson, Texas in 2016, and in 2017 acquired four companies — apartment market data provider Axiometrics, utility and energy management company American Utility Management, revenue management and pricing provider Lease Rent Options and also On-Site, a leasing and marketing platform company.

In 2018, RealPage announced an agreement to purchase electronic payment platform company ClickPay, located in Hackensack, New Jersey.

In July 2019, RealPage acquired utility management company SimpleBills.

In December 2019, RealPage acquired Buildium.

In January 2020, RealPage has agreed to acquire Modern Message, Inc.

In September 2020, RealPage acquired real estate loT startup Stratis.

In December 2020, private-equity firm Thoma Bravo announced it would acquire RealPage for $9.6 billion, paying $88.75 per share for the company, a premium of 31% for their closing prices at the time. Its shares were reported up 26% that year. The acquisition completed in April 2021.

In January 2021, RealPage acquired bulk Internet provider WhiteSky.

In November 2022, the United States Department of Justice's Antitrust Division opened an investigation into RealPage, which is accused of contributing to higher rent prices throughout the United States. The company's YieldStar software uses an algorithm to "help landlords push the highest possible rents on tenants."

References

1998 establishments in Texas
2021 mergers and acquisitions
Business software companies
Property management companies
Software companies based in Texas
Companies based in Richardson, Texas
Companies formerly listed on the Nasdaq
Software companies established in 1998
Software companies of the United States
American companies established in 1998
Private equity portfolio companies